The siege of Montevideo occurred during the War of Independence of Brazil, during which the Brazilian Army under Carlos Frederico Lecor attempted to capture the city of Montevideo in Cisplatina (now Uruguay) from the Portuguese Army of Álvaro da Costa de Sousa Macedo. The siege lasted from 20 January 1823 until 8 March 1824 when the Portuguese surrendered to the Brazilian forces. The naval defeat in the Battle of Montevideo (1823) also contributed to hasten the surrender of the Portuguese troops. The event marked the end of the resistance against independence of Brazil in its territory.

See also
Battle of Montevideo (disambiguation)
Battle of Montevideo (1823) (naval battle)

Notes

References
 
 

Colonial Uruguay
History of Montevideo
Conflicts in 1823
1823 in Brazil
1823 in Uruguay
Montevideo 1823
Montevideo 1823
19th century in Montevideo
January 1823 events